Thomas Leigh may refer to:

 Sir Thomas Leigh (died 1545), English ambassador and lawyer
 Thomas Leigh (Lord Mayor) (c. 1509–1572), Lord Mayor of London in 1558
 Thomas Leigh (MP for Bedford) (1512–1571), MP for Bedford, 1553–1559, Sheriff 1571
 Thomas Leigh, 1st Baron Leigh (1595–1672), English politician who sat in the House of Commons from 1628 to 1629
 Thomas Pemberton Leigh, 1st Baron Kingsdown (1793–1867), eldest son of Thomas Pemberton
 Tommy Leigh (footballer, born 1875) (1875–1914), English footballer

See also
Thomas Lee (disambiguation)
Thomas Legh (disambiguation)